"You're the Best" is a song recorded by R&B group the Emotions released as a single in 1984 on Red Label Records. The single reached No. 33 on the Billboard Dance Club Songs chart.

Background
You're the Best was composed and produced by Billy Osborne and Zane Giles. The song came from the Emotions 1984 studio album Sincerely.

Critical reception
Dave Hillson of Blues & Soul called the song an "80s boogie classic".

References

1984 songs
1984 singles
The Emotions songs